Muḥammad al-Kisāʾī (ca. 1100 CE) wrote a work on Stories of the Prophets (Qiṣaṣ al-'Anbiyā')

Work
Al-Kisā'i produced a collection of Stories of the Prophets with exegetic information not found elsewhere. He elaborates on earlier exegesis with a fuller narrative and folkloric elements from non-extant oral traditions that often parallel those from Christianity. He includes two prophets, Shem and Eleazar, not named in later literature as prophets. [Noegel and Wheeler.]

References

Sunni Muslim scholars of Islam
Iranian historians of Islam
11th-century Iranian historians